Gymnobathra omphalota is a moth of the family Oecophoridae. It was described by Edward Meyrick in 1888. It is found in New Zealand.

References

 Gymnobathra omphalota in species-id

Moths described in 1888
Oecophoridae